Zahid Akram Durrani is a Pakistani politician and a member of
Muttahida Majlis-e-Amal who is currently serving as 20th Deputy Speaker of the National Assembly since 21 April 2022. He has been a member of the National Assembly of Pakistan since October 2018 from NA-35 (Bannu).

Political career
Durrani was elected to the National Assembly of Pakistan as a candidate of Muttahida Majlis-e-Amal (MMA) from Constituency NA-35 (Bannu) in 2018 Pakistani by-elections held on 14 October 2018, he got 60,944 votes.

References

External Links

Living people
Muttahida Majlis-e-Amal politicians
Politicians from Khyber Pakhtunkhwa
Pakistani MNAs 2018–2023
Year of birth missing (living people)